Dala-Kildala Rivers Estuaries Provincial Park is a provincial park of 452 ha. in British Columbia, Canada. It protects the mouth of the Dala River in Kildala Arm.

Climate

References

External links
Homepage

North Coast of British Columbia
Provincial parks of British Columbia
Year of establishment missing